The Cook Peninsula is located on the eastern coast of Ellesmere Island, a part of the Qikiqtaaluk Region of the Canadian territory of Nunavut. North of Princess Marie Bay, it stretches eastward into Nares Strait.

References

Ellesmere Island
Peninsulas of Qikiqtaaluk Region